Yushan East Peak (Chinese: 玉山東峰; Pinyin: Yùshān Dōngfēng) is a mountain of the Yushan Range located in the Yushan National Park. With a height of 3,869 m (12,694 ft), it is the 3rd tallest mountain in Taiwan and the 2nd tallest in the Yushan Range.

Climbing 
Reaching the mountain requires going down a ridge behind the Main Peak and ascending up a series of steep cliffs.

See also 

 List of mountains in Taiwan

 100 Peaks of Taiwan
 Yushan
 Yushan Range
 Yushan National Park

References 

Mountains of Taiwan
Mountains of Asia